Przedsiębiorstwo Realizacji Filmów "Zespoły Filmowe" was a Polish state-owned film studio founded in 1969 after the closure of the production company Zespoły Autorów Filmowych in the aftermath of the March 1968 events.

Select filmography
1969 - How I Unleashed the Second World War (Jak rozpętałem drugą wojnę światową).
1969 - Hunting Flies (Polowanie na muchy).
1969-71 - Liberation (Wyzwolenie).
1974 - The Deluge (Potop).
1977 - Soldiers of Freedom (Sołdaty Swobody).
1978 - Test pilota Pirxa (The Test of Pilot Pirx)
1981 - Hands Up (Ręce do góry).
1988 - A Short Film About Killing (Krótki film o zabijaniu).

References
An article at Polish Internet Movie Database

Film production companies of Poland